James Earl Coleman Jr. (born December 1, 1946) is an American attorney. He currently serves as the John S. Bradway Professor of Law and Director of the Center for Criminal Justice and Professional Responsibility at the Duke University School of Law. He was the primary member of serial killer Ted Bundy's last defense team.

He became involved in the 2006 Duke lacrosse team scandal when he was appointed chair of the lacrosse ad hoc review committee by Duke University's president Richard H. Brodhead. He has appeared on 60 Minutes, The Early Show, and other national broadcasts.

He currently teaches Law at the Duke University School of Law where he is the co-director of the Duke Law Wrongful Convictions Clinic and faculty advisor of the Innocence Project. In 2015 Coleman was honored with the Raeder-Taslitz Award from the American Bar Association’s Criminal Justice Section. In 2022, Coleman was named the 2022 Lemkin Rule of Law Guardian by the Bolch Judicial Institute at Duke Law School.

Education and early career
Coleman was born in Charlotte, North Carolina in 1946. After graduating from a local public school in 1965, he attended a post-graduate year at Phillips Exeter Academy. He went on to attend Harvard University and Columbia Law School. Coleman clerked for the United States District Court for the Eastern District of Michigan.

After a year of private practice in New York, Coleman spent the next 15 years at the Washington, D.C. law firm of Wilmer Cutler and Pickering, the last 12 as a partner. Coleman also served as chief counsel for the U.S. House Committee on Standards of Official Conduct (Ethics Committee), and as deputy general counsel for the U.S. Department of Education.

Bundy litigation
In 1986, Coleman and his associate, Polly Nelson, joined the defense team of serial killer Ted Bundy. They were able to secure three stays before Bundy was finally executed on January 24, 1989. Coleman was featured in the Netflix series, Conversations with a Killer: The Ted Bundy Tapes, and the Amazon Prime Video series, Ted Bundy: Falling for a Killer.

Duke lacrosse
In 2006, Coleman was appointed head of a committee to investigate the university's lacrosse team's culture amid the rape allegation scandal. He was noted as one of the only people involved in the case to publicly speak out against former district attorney Mike Nifong for his missteps in handling the case.

In interviews with 60 Minutes and CBS, and in an article he wrote for the Huffington Post, Coleman voiced his concerns about the justice system on display throughout the Duke lacrosse case.

Coleman stated that Nifong had committed serious prosecutorial misconduct, and if there were a conviction, there "would be a basis to have the conviction overturned based on his conduct."

Wrongful convictions
As a professor at the Duke University School of Law, Coleman is the co-director of the Wrongful Convictions Clinic and the faculty advisor for the Innocence Project. Both programs work to exonerate wrongfully convicted inmates primarily in North Carolina. In recent years Coleman and the Wrongful Convictions Clinic have succeeded in exonerating former inmates including LaMonte Armstrong and Shawn Massey.

References

1946 births
Living people
Wilmer Cutler Pickering Hale and Dorr partners
Harvard University alumni
Wrongful conviction advocacy
Duke University School of Law faculty
Phillips Exeter Academy alumni
Columbia Law School alumni